This is a list of sovereign states in the 1830s, giving an overview of states around the world during the period between 1 January 1830 and 31 December 1839. It contains entries, arranged alphabetically, with information on the status and recognition of their sovereignty. It includes widely recognized sovereign states, entities which were de facto sovereign but which were not widely recognized by other states.

Sovereign states

A
Afghanistan – Emirate of Afghanistan 
 – Principality of Andorra 
 Anhalt-Bernburg – Duchy of Anhalt-Bernburg 
 Anhalt-Dessau – Duchy of Anhalt-Dessau 
 Anhalt-Köthen – Duchy of Anhalt-Köthen 
 Ankole – Kingdom of Ankole
Annam – Empire of Annam 
Anziku – Anziku Kingdom 
 →  Argentina 
United Provinces of the Río de la Plata 
Argentine Confederation 
 Aro – Aro Confederacy 
 – Asante Union 
 – Austrian Empire

B
 Baden – Grand Duchy of Baden 
Baguirmi – Kingdom of Baguirmi 
Bambara – Bambara Empire 
Baol – Kingdom of Baol 
Basutoland – Kingdom of Basutoland 
 – Kingdom of Bavaria 
 – Kingdom of Belgium 
Benin – Kingdom of Benin 
 – Kingdom of Bhutan 
 Bolivia – Bolivian Republic   
 Bornu – Bornu Empire 
 – Empire of Brazil 
 Bremen – Free City of Bremen
 – Sultanate of Brunei 
 – Duchy of Brunswick 
 Buganda – Kingdom of Buganda 
 Bukhara – Emirate of Bukhara 
 Bunyoro – Kingdom of Bunyoro-Kitara 
 Burma – Kingdom of Burma 
Burundi – Kingdom of Burundi

C
 Cambodia – Kingdom of Cambodia 
Cayor – Kingdom of Cayor 
 Central America – Federal Republic of Central America  Capital: Guatemala City (to 1834), San Salvador (from 1834 to 1838)
 – Republic of Chile 
 China – Great Qing 
 Costa Rica – Republic of Costa Rica

D
 Dahomey – Kingdom of Dahomey 
 – Kingdom of Denmark

E
 Ecuador – Republic of Ecuador  
 El Salvador – El Salvador  
 – Ethiopian Empire

F
 Fiji – Tui Viti 
 France – Kingdom of the French  
 Frankfurt – Free City of Frankfurt 
Futa Jallon – Imamate of Futa Jallon 
Futa Toro – Imamate of Futa Toro

G
Garo – Kingdom of Garo
Gomma – Kingdom of Gomma 
 – Republic of Colombia  
 Greece – Kingdom of Greece  
 Guatemala – Republic of Guatemala  
Gumma – Kingdom of Gumma

H
 – Republic of Haiti 
 – Free city of Hamburg
 Hanover – Kingdom of Hanover 
 Hawaii – Kingdom of Hawaii 
 Hesse-Darmstadt – Grand Duchy of Hesse and by Rhine 
 Hesse-Homburg – Landgraviate of Hesse-Homburg 
 Hesse-Kassel – Electorate of Hesse 
 Hohenzollern-Hechingen – Principality of Hohenzollern-Hechingen 
 Hohenzollern-Sigmaringen – Principality of Hohenzollern-Sigmaringen 
 (from 1838)
 Holstein – Duchy of Holstein

J
 Jabal Shammar – Emirate of Jabal Shammar  
Janjero – Kingdom of Janjero 
 Japan – Tokugawa shogunate 
Jimma – Kingdom of Jimma 
Johor – Johor Sultanate 
 – Jolof Kingdom 
 Juliana Republic – Juliana Republic

K
Kaabu – Kingdom of Kaabu 
Kaffa – Kingdom of Kaffa 
Kénédougou – Kénédougou Kingdom 
Khasso – Kingdom of Khasso 
 Khiva – Khanate of Khiva 
 Kokand – Khanate of Kokand 
Kong – Kong Empire 
 Kongo – Kingdom of Kongo 
 Korea – Kingdom of Joseon 
Koya Temne – Kingdom of Koya

L
 – Principality of Liechtenstein 
 Limburg – Duchy of Limburg 
Limmu-Ennarea – Kingdom of Limmu-Ennarea 
 Lippe – Principality of Lippe-Detmoldt 
 Loango – Kingdom of Loango 
Luba – Luba Empire
 Lübeck – Free City of Lübeck 
Lunda – Lunda Empire
 – Grand Duchy of Luxembourg

M
 Maldives – Sultanate of Maldives 
 Manipur – Kingdom of Manipur 
 Massina – Massina Empire 
Matabeleland – Matabele Kingdom  
 Mecklenburg-Schwerin – Grand Duchy of Mecklenburg-Schwerin 
 Mecklenburg-Strelitz – Grand Duchy of Mecklenburg-Strelitz 
 – Republic of Mexico 
 Mindanao – Sultanate of Maguindanao 
 Modena – Duchies of Modena and Reggio 
 Moldavia – Principality of Moldavia 
 – Principality of Monaco 
 Montenegro – Prince-Bishopric of Montenegro 
 – Sultanate of Morocco

N
 Nassau – Duchy of Nassau 
 Natalia – Natalia Republic  
 Nepal – Kingdom of Nepal 
 – United Kingdom of the Netherlands 
United Kingdom of the Netherlands 
Kingdom of the Netherlands 
 New Granada – Republic of New Granada  
 Nicaragua – Republic of Nicaragua  
 – Kingdom of Norway (in personal union with Sweden)

O
 Oldenburg – Grand Duchy of Oldenburg 
 – Sublime Ottoman State 
Ouaddai – Ouaddai Empire 
Oyo – Oyo Empire

P
 Pahang – Sultanate of Pahang 
 – States of the Church 
 – Republic of Paraguay 
 – Duchy of Parma, Piacenza and Guastalla 
 Perak – Sultanate of Perak 
 Persia – Persian Empire 
 Peru – Peruvian Republic   
 Peru, North – Republic of North Peru  
 Peru, South – Republic of South Peru  
  
 Poland – Congress Poland during November Uprising 
  Portugal – Kingdom of Portugal 
 – Kingdom of Prussia 
 Punjab – Sikh Empire

R
Rapa Nui – Kingdom of Rapa Nui
 Reuss Elder Line – Principality of Reuss Elder Line 
 Reuss Junior Line – Principality of Reuss Junior Line 
 Reuss-Lobenstein-Ebersdorf – Principality of Reuss-Lobenstein-Ebersdorf 
 Russia – Russian Empire 
Rwanda – Kingdom of Rwanda 
 – Kingdom of Ryūkyū

S
Samoa – Kingdom of Samoa 
 – Most Serene Republic of San Marino 
 Sardinia – Kingdom of Sardinia 
 Saxe-Altenburg – Duchy of Saxe-Altenburg 
 Saxe-Coburg-Gotha – Duchy of Saxe-Coburg and Gotha Capital: Coburg, Gotha
 Saxe-Meiningen – Duchy of Saxe-Meiningen 
 Saxe-Weimar-Eisenach – Grand Duchy of Saxe-Weimar-Eisenach 
 Saxony – Kingdom of Saxony 
 Schaumburg-Lippe – Principality of Schaumburg-Lippe 
 Schleswig – Duchy of Schleswig  Capital: Schleswig, Flensburg, Copenhagen
 Schwarzburg-Rudolstadt – Principality of Schwarzburg-Rudolstadt 
 Schwarzburg-Sondershausen – Principality of Schwarzburg-Sondershausen 
 Selangor – Sultanate of Selangor 
 Serbia – Principality of Serbia Capital: Belgrade, Kragujevac  (to 1838)
 – Kingdom of Siam 
Sikkim – Chogyalate of Sikkim 
 Sokoto – Sokoto Caliphate 
 – Kingdom of Spain 
 Sulu – Sultanate of Sulu 
 – Kingdom of Sweden (in personal union with Norway) 
 – Swiss Confederation

T
 – Kingdom of Tahiti 
 – Republic of Texas, from March 2, 1836 (several capitals). Sovereignty disputed by Mexico.
Tonga – Tu'i Tonga 
 Toro – Toro Kingdom
Toucouleur – Toucouleur Empire 
 Tuscany – Grand Duchy of Tuscany 
 Two Sicilies – Kingdom of the Two Sicilies

U
 – United Kingdom of Great Britain and Ireland 
 – United States of America 
 United States of the Ionian Islands – United States of the Ionian Islands 
  – Eastern Republic of Uruguay

V
 – Republic of Venezuela

W
 Waldeck-Pyrmont – Principality of Waldeck and Pyrmont 
Welayta – Kingdom of Welayta 
 Württemberg – Kingdom of Württemberg

Z
Zululand – Kingdom of the Zulus Capital: kwaBulawayo, umGungundlovu, Ulundi

States claiming sovereignty
 Aceh – Sultanate of Aceh
Goust – Republic of Goust
 Greece – Hellenic Republic 
Republic of Indian Stream – Republic of Indian Stream 
 Muskogee – State of Muskogee 
 Riograndense Republic 
 Soran – Soran Emirate 
 Tavolara – Kingdom of Tavolara

See also
List of Bronze Age states
List of Iron Age states
List of Classical Age states
List of states during Late Antiquity
List of states during the Middle Ages

1830s
1830s